Aftershock is an 2022 American documentary film, directed and produced by Paula Eiselt and Tonya Lewis Lee. It follows Omari Maynard and Bruce McIntyre, whose partners died due to childbirth complications, which were preventable, as they fight for justice.

It had its world premiere at the 2022 Sundance Film Festival on January 23, 2022. It was released on July 19, 2022, by ABC News Studios, Hulu and Onyx Collective.

Plot
Shamony Gibson and Amber Rose Isaac both died during childbirth from complications that were preventable. Their partners, Omari Maynard and Bruce McIntyre, come together with other fathers to fight for justice and build communities of support.

Release
It had its world premiere at the 2022 Sundance Film Festival on January 23, 2022. Shortly after, ABC News, Onyx Collective, and Hulu acquired distribution rights to the film. It also screened at South by Southwest on March 13, 2022.

Reception
Aftershock received highly positive reviews from film critics. On Rotten Tomatoes it has a 100% approval rating based on reviews from 27 critics, with an average rating of 8.10/10.

References

External links
 
 
 

2022 films
2022 documentary films
American documentary films
Documentary films about death
Documentary films about health care
Documentary films about pregnancy
Hulu original films
Onyx Collective original programming
2020s English-language films
2020s American films